The Ministry of Education, Sports and Youth is a department of the Albanian Government responsible for Education and Sport. The current minister is Evis Kushi.

History 
Since the establishment of the institution, the Ministry of Education has been reorganized by joining other departments or merging with other ministries, thus making its name change several times. This list reflects the changes made in years in pluralist history since 1992 as an institution:

 Ministry of Education (Ministria e Arsimit) from 1992 to 1996
 Ministry of Education and Sports (Ministria e Arsimit dhe Sportit) from 1996 to 1997
 Ministry of Education and Science (Ministria e Arsimit dhe Shkencës) from 1997 to 1998
 Ministry of Education (Ministria e Arsimit) from 1998 to 2001
 Ministry of Education and Science (Ministria e Arsimit dhe Shkencës) from 2001 to 2002
 Ministry of Education (Ministria e Arsimit) from 2002 to 2005
 Ministry of Education and Science (Ministria e Arsimit dhe Shkencës) from 2005 to 2013
 Ministry of Education and Sports (Ministria e Arsimit dhe Sportit) from 2013 to 2017
 Ministry of Education, Sports and Youth (Ministria e Arsimit, Sportit dhe Rinisë) from 2017 - current

Subordinate institutions
 General Directorate of Pre-University Education
 Regional Education Directorates
 Sports Service Agency
 Educational Services Center
 Quality Assurance Agency of Higher Education
 Agency for Quality Assurance in Pre-University Education
 National Agency of Scientific Research and Innovation
 National Youth Agency

Officeholders (1912–present)

Notes

See also
Education in Albania
Council of Ministers (Albania)

References

Education And Sport
Albania